is a Japanese footballer playing as a midfielder for Urawa Reds in the WE League.

Career statistics

Club

Notes

International

International goals
Scores and results list Japan's goal tally first.

References

1997 births
Living people
Association football people from Saitama Prefecture
Japanese women's footballers
Japan women's international footballers
Women's association football midfielders
Nadeshiko League players
Urawa Red Diamonds Ladies players
Footballers at the 2020 Summer Olympics
Olympic footballers of Japan